The EF 28mm lenses are a group of prime lenses made by Canon that share the same focal length.

These lenses use the EF type mount that fits the Canon EOS line of cameras. When used on a camera body with an APS-C sensor, such as the Canon EOS 700D, it provides a narrower field of view, equivalent to a 45 mm lens mounted on a 35 mm frame body. With a 1.3x body such as the Canon EOS-1D Mark III, it provides a less narrow field of view, equivalent to a 36 mm lens mounted on a 35 mm frame body.

Three EF 28mm lenses have been sold by Canon: 
 2.8, introduced April 1987 (now discontinued, replaced by 2.8 IS USM)
 1.8 USM, introduced September 1995
 2.8 IS USM introduced June 2012

With the discontinuation of the EF 15mm Fisheye Lens in 2011, the EF 28mm f/2.8 lens became the oldest EOS lens in production before being itself discontinued after the release of the IS version. The IS version marked another milestone for Canon; that lens and the 24mm f/2.8 IS lens introduced at the same time were Canon's first image-stabilized prime lenses with a focal length less than 100 mm, as well as the company's first image-stabilized non-L primes.

Specifications of the EF 28mm lenses

References

External links

 Canon EF 28mm f/1.8 review at The Digital Picture
 Canon EF 28mm f/2.8 review at The Digital Picture
 Canon EF 28mm f/2.8 IS review at The Digital Picture
 Canon EF 28mm f/1.8 review from Ken Rockwell

Canon EF lenses